Pennsylvania Route 546 (PA 546) is a  state highway in the northernmost regions of McKean County, Pennsylvania. The route, known locally as Oil Valley Road, begins at an intersection with PA 346 in the community of Duke Center (located in Otto Township). The highway heads northward, through mountainous regions before crossing the state line and into New York.

PA 546 was designated in the 1928 numbering of state highways in the commonwealth. The route was under construction and unpaved for two years afterward, and by 1930, the route was complete and has remained virtually intact since.

Route description 

PA 546 begins at an intersection with PA 346 in the community of Duke Center. The highway, known locally as Oil Valley Road, progresses to the northeast, intersecting with a short connector back to PA 346 (SR 9112). Duke Center is small and PA 546 runs along the center of the community. The community and PA 546 run along the base of the  mountain. PA 546 parallels the Knapp Creek, and after an intersecting with Galespie Hollow Road, the highway leaves Duke Center.

Continuing northward, the highway enters the community of Oil Valley, which the road is named for. At an intersection with Bootleg Hollow, Knapp Creek turns off PA 546. The route crosses the state line into New York and continues northward as the unnumbered Duke Center Road, which continues for about one half of a mile to an intersection with NY 16 in Knapp Creek, New York.

History 

PA 546 began in the 1928 numbering of state highways in the commonwealth of Pennsylvania. The route was assigned at the time on its current alignment, but the highway was not completely constructed. By 1929, this missing piece was completed, and was paved. However, the road was not complete, as there was an unpaved piece of PA 546 from that point This unpaved area was finished by the next year. PA 546, although, has remained intact in terms of alignment since its assignment in 1928.

Duke Center Road, the road that continues north into New York, was originally designated as County Route 45 in Cattaraugus County, but the designation was decommissioned and turned over to the town of Allegany.

Major intersections

See also

References

External links

Pennsylvania Highways: PA 546

546
Transportation in McKean County, Pennsylvania